Adam O. Anderson (born October 19, 1999) is an American football linebacker. He previously played college football for the Georgia Bulldogs.

High school career
Anderson attended Rome High School in Rome, Georgia. As a senior in 2017, he was The Atlanta Journal-Constitution's high school football player of the year after recording 63 tackles, 10 sacks and an interception. He was selected to the 2018 U.S. Army All-American Bowl. A five-star recruit, Anderson committed to the University of Georgia to play college football.

College career
As a true freshman at Georgia in 2018, Anderson played in all 14 games and had 16 tackles 0.5 sacks. As a sophomore in 2019, he again played in all 14 games, recording  six tackles and two sacks. As a junior in 2020, he played in all 10 games and finished with 14 tackles and 6.5 sacks. Anderson returned to Georgia for his senior season in 2021 rather than enter the 2021 NFL Draft.

Arrest 
On November 10, 2021, Anderson turned himself into police and was charged with felony rape after a 21-year-old woman accused him of raping her in an apartment in Athens, Georgia, on October 29, 2021, which was reported to police the same day. Through his attorney, Anderson has denied the accusation. Anderson was indefinitely suspended by the University of Georgia football team after they learned of the accusation on November 2, 2021.

References

External links
Georgia Bulldogs bio

Living people
Sportspeople from Rome, Georgia
Players of American football from Georgia (U.S. state)
American football linebackers
Georgia Bulldogs football players
1999 births